Royal Air Force Skitten or more simply RAF Skitten is a former Royal Air Force satellite station directly east of the village of Killimster, located  north east of Watten, Caithness, Scotland and  northwest of Wick, Caithness, Scotland. On 19 November 1942, Operation Freshman departed from RAF Skitten.

History
Squadrons

Units
 No. 1693 (General Reconnaissance) Flight (September - December 1943)
 No. 2709 Squadron RAF Regiment
 No. 2716 Squadron RAF Regiment
 No. 4010 Anti-Aircraft Flight RAF Regiment

Current use
The site is now used for quarrying and as farmland.

See also
 List of former Royal Air Force stations

References

Citations

Bibliography

Royal Air Force stations of World War II in the United Kingdom
Royal Air Force stations in Scotland
Caithness
Defunct airports in Scotland
Military airbases established in 1940